Jong-Oh Park (박종오; born September 13, 1955) is a South Korean robotics scholar. He is President of the Korea Institute of Medical Microrobotics and Robot Research Initiative. He joined the faculty of the school of Mechanical System Engineering at the Chonnam National University in South Korea, and presently serves as an executive board member at the International Federation of Robotics (IFR). He has twice received the Scientist of The Year Prize from the Korea Science Reporters Association, and is also the recipient of the IFR's Golden Robot Award, among many other honours. He has also successfully commercialized several robotic systems for medical and industrial applications.

Biography

Education
Jong Oh Park received a B.S in Mechanical Engineering from Yonsei University in Seoul. In 1981, he received a M.S in Mechanical Engineering at KAIST in Daejeon.

After his master's degree, he finished a Ph.D in Stuttgart University and worked as a researcher under the supervision of Hans-Jurgen Warnecke at 
Fraunhofer-IPA, Stuttgart, Germany from 1982 to 1987.

Career
From 1987 to 2004 he was associated with the Korea Institute of Science and Technology.

He had served as a director of 21C Frontier Project “ Intelligent Microsystem Program” for 5 years.

From 1987 till 2004 he was associated with the Korea Institute of Science and Technology. He had served as a director of 21C Frontier Project “ Intelligent Microsystem Program” for 5 years.

Since 2005, he has been a professor of Chonnam National University and a director of Robot Research Initiative in parallel.
Jong Oh Park was the Chairman of ‘The International Federation of Robotics (IFR)’ in 2005 and has been the executive board member of IFR since 2006.

In 2013, he worked as a Vice Chair of Organizing Committee of ISR 2013 and an Organizing chair of ICCAS 2013.

He was an Editor of IEEE Biorob 2014.
He has been a director of Medical microrobot center since 2013.
He has been currently serving as a Vice Chairman of 'Korea Robotics Society' and ‘Institute of Control, Robotics and Systems and also the member of New industry investment strategic council of the ministry of Industry and trade of Russian Federation since 2014.

He has been appointed as the member of Presidential Committee on the 4th Industrial Revolution and Ad Hoc Committee on the Healthcare since 2017.

Work

Academic work
Jong Oh Park made a great contribution to Robot industry through scientific outcome and technical transfer.

As the representative achievements, he accomplished the world’s first colonoscope robot in 2001 and successful commercialized in 2005.

He developed the capsule endoscope robot in 2005.

He succeed in the world’s first successful in-vivo test for using intravascular microrobot with 1 mm diameter.

He developed the World’s first cancer-treating nanorobot that can selectively target and help treat cancer in 2013.

Technology transfer
Jong Oh Park succeeded in technology transfer to industry.

He transferred Automatic Insertion Robot of Odd-Parts to Samsung Electronics in 1991, polishing Robot of Die&Moulds to Hwacheon Machine Tool Co in 1993 and Automatic Polishing of Faucet to Yujin Waterworks in 1994.

He also contracted technology transfer with Daewoo Motor Co. and Hyundai Motor Co. for Intelligent Grinding Robot for Car Brazing Bead in 1997. 
In 2005, he transferred Colonoscope Robot to ERA Endoscope Inc in Italy and Capsule Endoscope to Intromedic Inc.

In 2015 he transferred Active Locomotive Intestinal Capsule Endoscope to Woo Young Medical.

In 2017 he transferred Stem Cell-based Biomedical Microrobot to biot Inc.

Awards 
 2018: Gang YoungGuk Technology Award, ICROS
 2016: Dasan Grand Prize, The 10th Dasan Grand Prize Committee, Korea
 2015: Award of President of Chonnam National University.
 2015: "Fraunhofer medal laureate, Fraunhofer
 2014: Fumio Harashima Mechatronics Award, ICROS
 2013: Academic Award at College of Engineering, Chonnam National University
 2010 and 2013: Scientist of the Year Award, Korea Science Journalists Association
 2013: Order of Science of Technology Merit ‘Hyeoksin Medal’ to Ministry of Science, ICT and Future Planning of Korea
 2009: Best Conference Paper Award to IEEE ROBIO 2009
 2007: Award of Ministry of Commerce, Industry and Economy
 2007: Excellence paper award at the 2007 Summer Symposium of Korea 
 2001: The First Grand Prize of The Man of KIST 
 1997: Golden Robot Award in International Federation of Robotics
 1992: Grand Prize of Science & Technology, Jeong Jin-Ghi Foundation of Mass
 1991: Jang Young Sil Award to Ministry of Science and Technology
 91/92/95/96/00: KIST Excellence Research and Development Award

Selected papers 
 “New paradigm for tumor theranostic methodology using bacteria-based microrobot ”Nature, Scientific Reports, 2013.12.02.
 “Controlling uniformity of photopolymerized microscopic hydrogels” LAB ON A CHIP, 2014.02.05.
 “Active Locomotive Intestinal Capsule Endoscope (ALICE) System: A Prospective Feasibility Study” IEEE-ASME TRANSACTIONS ON MECHATRONICS,2015.02.01.

References

External links 
 Personal web : 
 KIMIRo portal : http://www.kimiro.re.kr/
 RRI portal : http://www.rri.re.kr/

Living people
1955 births
South Korean engineers
Yonsei University alumni
Academic staff of Chonnam National University
Academic staff of KAIST